Pityophthorus is a genus of typical bark beetles in the family Curculionidae. There are more than 540 described species in Pityophthorus.

See also
 List of Pityophthorus species

References

Further reading

External links

 

Scolytinae
Articles created by Qbugbot